The Black Sea sprat, Clupeonella cultriventris, is a small fish of the herring family, Clupeidae. It is found in the Black Sea and Sea of Azov and rivers of its basins: Danube, Dnister, Dnipro (Ukraine), Southern Bug, Don, Kuban. It has white-grey flesh and silver-grey scales. A typical size is 10 cm (maximum 15 cm) The life span is of up to 5 years. The peak of its spawning is in April and it can be found in enormous shoals in sea-shores, filled all-round coastal shallows, moving quickly back in the sea at a depth of 6–30 metres. Used for food; it has around 12% fat in flesh.

It is one of the most abundant fishes in the Sea of Azov. It is important prey for other fishes, particularly the pikeperch.

The Caspian tyulka Clupeonella caspia has been long considered a subspecies of C. cultriventris, C. cultriventris caspia, and a common name "Black and Caspian Sea sprat" was then applied to the whole.

See also
 List of fish in Ukraine

References

Fish of the Black Sea
Fish of Europe
Clupeonella
Fish described in 1840
Taxa named by Alexander von Nordmann